Tar River Transit is the primary provider of mass transportation in Rocky Mount, North Carolina. Service runs Monday through Saturday along ten routes.

Routes
 Meadowbrook
 Oakwood
 South Rocky Mount
 Hillsdale
 Golden East
 Ravenwood
 Sunset
 Nash Community College / Little Easonburg Shuttle
 Battleboro / Goldrock Shuttle
 Rocky Mount East

References

External links
 TRT

Bus transportation in North Carolina
Rocky Mount, North Carolina
Transportation in Edgecombe County, North Carolina
Transportation in Nash County, North Carolina